Curtis Brantley (born January 20, 1940) is an American former politician in the state of South Carolina. He served in the South Carolina House of Representatives from 2007 to 2012 from the 122nd district. He is an educator and former school principal and college professor.

References

1940 births
Living people
People from Ridgeland, South Carolina
Democratic Party members of the South Carolina House of Representatives